Jaroslav Hübl may refer to:

Jaroslav Hübl (ice hockey b. 1957), ice hockey player from the Czechoslovak era
Jaroslav Hübl (ice hockey b. 1982), ice hockey goaltender